Henry Johnson was Archdeacon of The Upper Niger from 1878 to 1891.

Johnson was born in 1840 as an Omoba of the Oyo people. He trained for the priesthood at Church Missionary Society College, Islington. He was ordained deacon at  St. George's Cathedral, Sierra Leone in 1866, and priest in 1867. Johnson served at Fourah Bay, Sherbro and Lokoja. He was appointed an honorary M.A. of Cambridge University in 1886.

Johnson died in 1901.

References

1840 births
1901 deaths
Archdeacons of the Niger
People associated with the University of Cambridge
Saro people
Yoruba Christian clergy
19th-century Nigerian Anglican priests
20th-century Nigerian Anglican priests
People from colonial Nigeria
Alumni of the Church Missionary Society College, Islington
Abiodun family